The Cleveland Rockers were a Women's National Basketball Association (WNBA) team based in Cleveland, that played from 1997 until 2003. The Rockers were one of the original eight franchises of the WNBA, which started in 1997. The owner was Gordon Gund, who at the time also owned the NBA's Cleveland Cavaliers. In October 2003, Gund announced that his Gund Arena Company would no longer operate the Rockers. The team folded after the 2003 season as the league was not able to find new ownership for the team.

Franchise history
The city of Cleveland was granted one of the original 8 franchises of the WNBA in October 1996. The Cleveland Rockers got their nickname from Cleveland's Rock and Roll Hall of Fame. In 1997, they started with such players like Isabelle Fijalkowski and former Harlem Globetrotters member Lynette Woodard, who had been the first female player in Globetrotter history.

The Rockers finished 15–13 in the first WNBA season ever, missing the playoffs in 1997. In 1998, the Rockers went 20–10 and won the Eastern Conference title. However, the Rockers lost to the Phoenix Mercury in the WNBA semifinals (before the WNBA split the playoffs by conference).

The Rockers had their best regular season in 2001, going 22–10 and winning the Eastern Conference, getting the No. 1 seed. Their relentless defense allowed just 55.9 points per game that year, a record that still stands.  But the Rockers would be upended by the Charlotte Sting in the 1st round, losing 2 games to 1. The 2002 Rockers fell by 12 games over the previous year's mark, posting a 10–22 record. In 2003, the Rockers would go 17–17, good enough for the No. 4 seed in the East; however, they would fall in the first round of the playoffs to the eventual champion Detroit Shock, 2–1.  2003 was the Rockers' last playoff appearance, and is the only team in the WNBA to qualify for the playoffs in their last season of play.

Folding
After the 2002 season, the Gunds decided to buy the Rockers from the WNBA, seemingly ensuring the Rockers' future. However, despite fielding competitive teams and having decent attendance for most games, the Gund family decided they did not wish to operate the Rockers after the 2003 season. No local ownership was found for the team, forcing the Rockers to fold in December 2003, and the players went to the other teams in the league via a dispersal draft in January 2004. The Rockers ceased operation after seven seasons, posting an all-time record of 108–112. A WNBA franchise would next fold in 2008 when the Houston Comets ceased operations because of lack of ownership.

Season-by-season records

Hall of famers

Naismith Basketball Hall of Fame

FIBA Hall of Famers

Notable players

Coaches and others
Head coaches:
 Linda Hill-MacDonald (1997–1999)
 Dan Hughes (2000–2003)

General Managers:
 Wayne Embry (1997–99)
 Jim Paxson

Assistant coaches
 Mike Wilhelm (1997–99)
 Lisa Boyer (1998-2002)
 Cheryl Reeve (2003)

References

 
Defunct Women's National Basketball Association teams
Basketball teams established in 1997
Basketball teams disestablished in 2003
1997 establishments in Ohio
2003 disestablishments in Ohio